Lecanora argopholis is a species of crustose lichen in the family Lecanoraceae. It was originally named Parmelia atra var. argopholis by Erik Acharius in 1803, then transferred by him to the genus Lecanora in 1810. The lichen has a circumpolar distribution.

See also
List of Lecanora species

References

Lichens described in 1803
Lichen species
Lichens of North America
argopholis
Taxa named by Erik Acharius